February 1: World Hijab Day
Second Sunday in February: International Purple Hijab Day
February 20: Promised Reformer Day (Ahmadiyya)
February 28: Teachers' Day (Arab states)
March 23: Promised Messiah Day (Ahmadiyya)
May 27: Caliphate Day (Ahmadiyya)
July 11: Imamat Day (Nizari Ismaili Shiʿi Muslims)
December 25: Malkh-Festival (Pre-Islamic, celebrated by Muslim Nakh peoples)

See also
List of observances set by the Islamic calendar

Islamic
Islamic culture